Sainte-Osmane is a former commune in the Sarthe department in the region of Pays de la Loire in north-western France. On 1 January 2019, it was merged into the new commune Val-d'Étangson. The 17th-century French Benedictine Ambroise Janvier (1613–1682) was born in the village.

The commune is named after Saint Osmanna, who hermitage was said to be there, afterwards the site of a church.

See also
Communes of the Sarthe department

References

Former communes of Sarthe